David Wolfe may refer to:

 David Wolfe (Jesuit) (died 1578), Irish papal legate
 David Wolfe (actor) (1953–1994)
 David A. Wolfe (born 1951), psychologist and author
 David Wolfe (raw food advocate) (born 1970), product spokesman and promoter of pseudoscientific theories
 David Wolfe (mathematician), co-author of Mathematical Go Endgames
 David W. Wolfe (born 1942), member of the New Jersey General Assembly
 David Møller Wolfe (born 2002), Norwegian footballer

See also
David Wolf (disambiguation)